The Darkest Hour is a 2011 science fiction action film directed by Chris Gorak from a screenplay by Jon Spaihts and produced by Timur Bekmambetov. The film stars Emile Hirsch, Max Minghella, Olivia Thirlby, Rachael Taylor, and Joel Kinnaman as a group of people caught in an alien invasion. The film was released on December 25, 2011 in the United States, and grossed $65 million on a $35 million budget.

Plot
Two Americans, Ben and Sean, travel to Moscow to sell a piece of software. After arriving, they find their business partner, Skyler, has betrayed them by already selling a knockoff application. Disappointed, the pair goes to a nightclub and meets tourists Natalie and Anne. Suddenly, the lights go out and everyone heads outside. There, they witness balls of light fall from the sky and fade away. Invisible entities begin hunting and disintegrating people, generating panic.

Ben, Sean, Natalie, Anne, and now Skyler hide in the club's storeroom for seven days. With most of their food gone, the group leaves the club and finds the city full of scorched cars and cinders, but empty of people. While they search for supplies in a police car, an alien appears. They hide as it moves closer, causing the car's lights and siren to turn on. This makes Sean realize that light bulbs and other technologies give the aliens away. The group takes shelter in a shopping mall. Sean and Natalie go to look for clothes and almost run into an alien who cannot see them through a glass wall. Sean theorizes that the aliens can only see their electrical charge, but not through glass or other insulators.

The group finds the US embassy gutted and lifeless. A logbook there tells them that the invasion is worldwide. They also discover a radio broadcasting a message in Russian. During their search, Skyler is killed by the aliens. The others see a light in a nearby apartment tower and go to investigate. They find a young woman named Vika and a man named Sergei, an electrical engineer. Sergei has made his apartment into a giant Faraday cage that hides everyone from the aliens. He has also developed a microwave gun that weakens an alien's force field, so that it can actually be seen and killed. Vika and Sergei translate the radio message, which says that a nuclear submarine is waiting in the Moscow River to take survivors to safety, but will leave soon.

Vika, Natalie, and Anne go to other apartments to gather supplies. An alien senses them outside the Faraday cage and gives chase. When they get to the apartment, the alien gets inside with them. Sergei shoots the alien with his gun, to no avail. The alien kills him while the others escape. Anne is also killed in the ensuing chase. To fight back, Natalie sets the apartment on fire and meets up with Vika.

The group later meets with Russian policemen who manage to wound an alien with conventional weapons. Sean collects a piece of the alien's body while the small police band agrees to help the group get to the submarine. As they move through the subway, an alien discovers them and kills Ben.

The survivors make it to a powerless patrol boat on the river and drift downstream to the waiting submarine. The boat nears the submarine, but runs aground. As they attempt to push free, an alien light beam causes the boat to capsize. Sean and the policemen swim towards the submarine, but upon reaching it, they discover Natalie is missing. Sean is determined to get her, possibly missing his chance to escape. The policemen agree to help him. The submarine crew, after expressing their doubts about the rescue, assist by building another microwave gun with stronger batteries.

Sean finds Natalie on a bus while the policemen and Vika start destroying aliens with the microwave guns. During the battle, Sean discovers the creatures' weakness when he throws a piece of the wounded alien he collected to another one, killing it. The two stop the bus and narrowly avoid a collision.

After returning to the submarine, the police team decides to stay and fight for the city. Meanwhile Sean, Natalie, and Vika plan to spread what they learned about the aliens to the rest of the world. Sean and Natalie, the only survivors of the original group, nearly share a kiss until Vika scoffs and breaks the romantic tension in a light-hearted moment. In the last scene, they learn that multiple resistance groups are fighting in different cities all around the world.

Cast
 Emile Hirsch as Sean, Natalie's love interest
 Olivia Thirlby as Natalie, Sean's love interest
 Max Minghella as Ben, Sean's best friend
 Rachael Taylor as Anne, Natalie's best friend
 Joel Kinnaman as Skyler
 Dato Bakhtadze as Sergei
 Gosha Kutsenko as Matvei
 Veronika Vernadskaya as Vika
 Nikolay Efremov as Sasha
 Pyotr Fyodorov as Anton Batkin
 Georgiy Gromov as Boris
 Artur Smolyaninov as Yuri
 Anna Rudakova as Tess

Production
The Darkest Hour was directed by Chris Gorak and produced by Timur Bekmambetov. While most films about alien invasions are centered in the United States or have an international scale, Bekmambetov's involvement ensured the premise to be an alien invasion from Russia's perspective.

With a production budget of $34.8 million, filming with 3D cameras began in Moscow on July 18, 2010. Production used resources from the Russian-based company Bazelevs, owned by Bekmambetov.

Filming was temporarily suspended three weeks later due to the 2010 Russian wildfires affecting the city and its vicinity with their smog. By September 2010, filming had resumed. In April 2011 the release date was changed to December 25 due to filming conflicts in Russia.

Release
The Darkest Hour was released on December 25, 2011, in the United States in 2D, 3D and RealD 3D. The DVD release date was April 10, 2012, by Summit Entertainment. In the United Kingdom, it was released theatrically on January 13, 2012 and on DVD on May 21, 2012.

Reception
Rotten Tomatoes gives a score of 12% based on reviews from 59 critics and an average score of 3.16/10. The site's critical consensus reads, "Devoid of believable characters or convincing visual effects, this may be The Darkest Hour for the careers of all involved."

The Hollywood Reporter criticized the film for having a "flatlining screenplay and the absence of even a single compelling character", and The New York Times wrote that it has "a depressing failure of imagination". Writing for Slant Magazine, Budd Wilkins called it "a dimwitted 3D sci-fi travesty" and wrote, "Indifferently structured, Jon Spaihts's lame-brained script knows no narrative contrivance it doesn't love and, what's worse, blows its expositional load in the first 10 minutes, bringing together a quintet of cardboard cutout leads."  Joe Leydon of Variety called it a "modestly inventive and involving variation on a standard-issue sci-fi doomsday scenario".

References

External links
 
 
 
 

2011 films
2010s monster movies
2011 3D films
2011 action thriller films
American action thriller films
American monster movies
American science fiction action films
American science fiction thriller films
2010s Russian-language films
English-language Russian films
Apocalyptic films
Films set in Moscow
Films set in the Caspian Sea
Films set on airplanes
Films shot in Moscow
Films shot in Russia
Regency Enterprises films
20th Century Fox films
Summit Entertainment films
Alien invasions in films
Russian science fiction action films
Films scored by Tyler Bates
Films about invisibility
Science fiction submarine films
Bazelevs Company films
2010s English-language films
2010s American films